The Northwest African cheetah (Acinonyx jubatus hecki), also known as the Saharan cheetah, is a cheetah subspecies native to the Sahara and the Sahel. It is listed as Critically Endangered on the IUCN Red List. In 2008, the population was suspected to number less than 250 mature individuals.

The Northwest African cheetah was described by German zoologist Max Hilzheimer in 1913 under the scientific name Acinonyx hecki.

Taxonomy
Felis jubata senegalensis was described by Henri Marie Ducrotay de Blainville in 1843 based on a cheetah from Senegal. As this name was preoccupied, it is considered synonymous with A. j. hecki.

Acinonyx hecki was the scientific name proposed by Max Hilzheimer in 1913, based upon a captive cheetah in the Berlin Zoological Garden that also originated in Senegal.

Characteristics

The Northwest African cheetah is quite different in appearance from the other African cheetahs. Its coat is shorter and nearly white in color, with spots that fade from black over the spine to light brown on the legs. The face has few or even no spots, and the tear stripes (dark stripes running from the medial canthus of each eye down the side of the muzzle to the corner of the mouth) are often missing. The body shape is basically the same as that of the sub-Saharan cheetah, except that it is somewhat smaller.

Distribution and habitat
This cheetah ranges in the western and central Sahara and the Sahel in small, fragmented populations.

In Niger, populations occur in the northern parts of the country in the Ténéré desert and in the southern savanna region of W National Park. Records in Togo date to the 1970s. The Saharan cheetah is thought to be regionally extinct in Morocco, Western Sahara, Senegal, Guinea, Guinea-Bissau, Sierra Leone, Côte d'Ivoire and Ghana.

In Mali, cheetahs were sighted in Adrar des Ifoghas and in the Kidal Region in the 1990s.
In 2010, a cheetah was photographed in Niger's Termit Massif by a camera trap.

No cheetah was recorded in the North Province, Cameroon during a survey carried out between January 2008 and May 2010.

Between August 2008 and November 2010, four individuals were recorded by camera traps in Ahaggar National Park located in south central Algeria.

Behavior and ecology
In the Sahara desert, day-time temperature exceeds , water is scarce and rainfall irregular. Two camera trapping surveys in the Ahaggar massif revealed that cheetahs in this area exhibit several behavioral adaptations to this harsh climate: they are predominantly nocturnal and active between sunset and early mornings; they travel larger distances and occur at a lower density than cheetahs living in savannas.

The main prey of the Northwest African cheetah are antelopes which have adapted to an arid environment, such as the addax, Dorcas gazelle, rhim gazelle, and dama gazelle. It also preys on smaller mammals such as hares. Cheetahs can subsist without direct access to water, obtaining water indirectly from the blood of their prey.

See also
 Asiatic cheetah
 Northeast African cheetah

References

External links
 North African Cheetah Research and Conservation

northwest African cheetah
Mammals of North Africa
Mammals of West Africa
Fauna of Benin
Fauna of Burkina Faso
Fauna of Mali
Fauna of Niger
Fauna of Togo
Fauna of the Sahara
Critically endangered fauna of Africa
northwest African cheetah
Subspecies